Caprice of the Mountains is a 1916 American silent drama film directed by John G. Adolfi, and starring June Caprice, Harry Hilliard, Joel Day, Lisle Leigh, and Richard Hale. The film was released by Fox Film Corporation on July 9, 1916.

Plot summary
Wealthy playboy Jack Edmunds spends some time in a small mountain town, where he makes the acquaintance of local girl Caprtice Talbert and invites her to his apartment. When Caprice's father finds out about it — although nothing happened — he forces the two to marry, and the newlyweds move to Jack's home in the city. Tensions arise between the two as Jack is still resentful over the "shotgun wedding" and Caprice finds that she can't bear living in the big city and wants to return home.

Cast
June Caprice as Caprice Talbert
Harry Hilliard as Jack Edmunds
Joel Day as Dave Talbert
Lisle Leigh as Maria Baker
Richard Hale as Tim Baker
Albert Gran as James Edmunds
Tom Burrough as Tom Edmunds
Robert D. Walker as Dick Deane
Sara Alexander as Caprice's aunt
Harriet Thompson as Fairy queen
Grace Beaumont
Sidney Bracey
Zena Keefe
Leo A. Kennedy
Lucia Moore
Genevieve Reynolds
Robert Vivian

Preservation
The film is now considered lost.

See also
1937 Fox vault fire
List of lost films

References

External links

1916 drama films
Silent American drama films
1916 films
American silent feature films
American black-and-white films
Lost American films
Fox Film films
Films directed by John G. Adolfi
1916 lost films
Lost drama films
1910s English-language films
1910s American films